Plesiadapis is one of the oldest known primate-like mammal genera which existed about 58–55 million years ago in North America and Europe. Plesiadapis means "near-Adapis", which is a reference to the adapiform primate of the Eocene period, Adapis. Plesiadapis tricuspidens, the type specimen, is named after the three cusps present on its upper incisors.

Taxonomy 
The first discovery of Plesiadapis was made by François Louis Paul Gervaise in 1877, who first discovered Plesiadapis tricuspidens in France. The type specimen is MNHN Crl-16, and is a left mandibular fragment dated to the early Eocene epoch.

This genus probably arose in North America and colonized Europe on a landbridge via Greenland. Thanks to the abundance of the genus and to its rapid evolution, species of Plesiadapis play an important role in the zonation of Late Paleocene continental sediments and in the correlation of faunas on both sides of the Atlantic. Two remarkable skeletons of Plesiadapis, one of them nearly complete, have been found in lake deposits at Menat, France. Although the preservation of the hard parts is poor, these skeletons still show remains of skin and hair as a carbonaceous film—something unique among Paleocene mammals. Details of the bones are better preserved in fossils from Cernay, also in France, where Plesiadapis is one of the most common mammals.

Classification

The following are possible shared derived features of Plesiadapiformes: maxillary-frontal contact in orbit, the presence of a suboptic foramen, an ossified external auditory meatus, the absence of a promontory artery, the absence of a stapedial artery, and a strong mastoid tubercle.

Although the placement of the Plesiadapis lineage is still up for debate, the consensus in the 1970s was that they were closest to early tarsier-like primates. Plesiadapiformes have also been proposed as a nonprimate sister group to Eocene-Recent primates. A study done in 1987 linked Plesiadapiformes with adapids and omomyids through nine shared-derived features, six of which are cranial or dental: (1) auditory bulla inflated and formed by the petrosal bone, (2) ectotympanic expanded laterally and fused medially to the wall of the bulla, (3) promontorium centrally positioned in the bulla, and large hypotympanic sinus widely separating promontorium from the basisphenoid, (4) internal carotid entering the bulla posteriolaterally and enclosed in a bony tube, (5) nannopithex fold on the upper molars, and (6) loss of one pair of incisors.

In 2013, a phylogenetic analysis that includes also the basal primate Archicebus positions Plesiadapis firmly outside of the Primates, as a sister group to both Primates and Dermoptera.

{| class="wikitable collapsed" style="width:75%;"
|- style="background:#115a6c;"
!Species
!Synonyms
!Localities
|-
|P. tricuspidens (type species)Gervais, 1877
|
P. gervaisiLemoin, 1887
P. rhemensisRütmeyer, 1891
P. remensisStehlin, 1916
P. trouessartiSchlosser, 1921
|
Cernay, France
Lentille, France
Berru, France
Rilly, France
|-
|P. intermediusGazin, 1971
|
Pronothodectes matthewiGazin, 1956
Pr. simpsoniGazin, 1956
Nannodectes intermediusGingerich, 1974
Na. gaziniGingerich, 1974
|
Douglas Quarry, Montana
Little Muddy Creek, Montana
Keefer Hill, Wyoming
Saddle, Wyoming
|-
|P. simpsoniGazin, 1956
|
Pr. simpsoniGazin, 1956
P. jepseniGazin, 1956
Na. simpsoniGingerich, 1974
|
Ledge, Wyoming
West End, Wyoming
|-
|P. gidleyiMatthew, 1917
|
Nothodectes gidleyiMatthew, 1917
P. tricuspidensTeilhard, 1922
Na. gidleyiGingerich, 1974
|
Mason Pocket, Colorado
Joe's Bone Bed, Texas
Black Peaks, Texas
|-
|P. fodinatusJepsen, 1930
|
P. rubeyiGazin, 1942
P. farisiDorr, 1952
P. jepseniGazin, 1956
|
Princeton Quarry, Wyoming
Schaff Quarry, Wyoming
Ravenscrag, Saskatchewan
Titanoides, Wyoming
Fossil Hollow, Wyoming
Chappo, Wyoming
Dell Creek Quarry, Wyoming
|-
|P. dubiusMatthew, 1915
|No. dubiusMatthew, 1915P. pearceiGazin, 1956
|
Paint Creek, Wyoming
Plateau Valley, Colorado
Bearcreek, Montana
Togwotee, Wyoming
Chappo, Wyoming
Clark Fork, Wyoming
|-
|P. ancepsSimpson, 1936
|P. jepseniGazin, 1956P. praecursorGingerich, 1974
|
Tongue River, North Dakota
Douglas Quarry, Montana
Keefer Hill, Wyoming
Scarritt Quarry, Montana
Saddle, Wyoming
Highway blowout, Montana
|-
|P. rexGidley, 1923
|Tetonius rexGidley, 1923No. gidleyiSimpson, 1927P. paskapooensisRussel, 1964
|
Melville, Montana
Ledge, Wyoming
Cedar Point, Wyoming
Battle Mountain, Montana
Chappo, Wyoming
Erikson's Landing, Alberta
Love Quarry, Wyoming
Twin Creek, Wyoming
West End, Wyoming
|-
|P. churchilliGingerich, 1974
|P. farisiKrishtalka, 1975
|
Croc Tooth Quarry, Wyoming
Airport, Wyoming
Long Draw Quarry, Montana
Badwater, California
Sand Draw, Wyoming
|-
|P. simonsiGingerich, 1974
|
|
Sand Draw, Wyoming
|-
|P. cookeiJepsen, 1930
|
|
Little Sand Coulee Area, Wyoming
Paint Creek, Wyoming
Red Creek, Wyoming
Susan, Wyoming
Verland's, Wyoming
|-
|P. insignisPiton, 1940
|Sciurus feignouxiLaunay, 1908Menatotherium insignePiton, 1940
|
Menat, France
|-
|P. walbeckensisRussel, 1964
|
|
Walbeck, Germany
|-
|P. remensisLemoine, 1887
|
|
Cernay, France
Lentille, France
Berru, France
|-
|P. russelliGingerich, 1974
|P. daubreiTeilhard, 1922Platychoerops daubreiRussell, 1967
|
Meudon, France
|}

 Anatomy and remains Plesiadapis is one of the most completely known early primatomorphs, with a significant amount of the skeleton known. Though, the skeleton is mostly known from P. gidleyi and the relatively late (derived) P. tricuspidens. The skull is overall reminiscent of a lemur, though it lacks the postorbital bars (a vertical bar bordering the posterior margin of the eye socket). The brain was probably relatively large compared to similarly sized contemporary mammals, namely the arctocyonids. The dental formula is usually , with two incisors, one canine, three premolars, and three molars in either half of the upper jaw; and one incisor, one canine, three premolars, and one molar in either half of the lower jaw. The incisors are quite long. Already, Plesiadapis had lost the first premolar from the mammalian common ancestor, but later primatomorphs would lose the second premolar as well. P. dubius consistently lacks the lower second premolar, and about half of P. rex specimens lack it too. P. gidleyi and European Plesiadapis lack the lower canines.

The skeletal adaptations are consistent with a largely arboreal lifestyle in the trees. The sacrum of P. gidleyi is similar to that of the eastern gray squirrel, though lacking the strong spines. The humerus is robust and features a strong S-curve.

Nearly all of what is known about the anatomy of plesiadapiforms comes from fragmentary jaws and teeth, so most definitions of plesiadapiform genera and species are based on dentition. Plesiadapis' dentition shows a functional shift toward grinding and crushing in the cheek teeth as an adaptation towards increasing omnivority and herbivority. 
The skull of Plesiadapis is relatively broad and flat, with a long snout with rodent-like jaws and teeth and long, gnawing incisors separated by a gap from its molars. Orbits are still directed to the side, unlike the forward-facing eyeballs of modern primates that enable three-dimensional vision. Plesiadapis had mobile limbs that terminated in strongly curved claws, and it sported a long bushy tail which is preserved in the Menat skeletons. The way of life of Plesiadapis has been much debated in the past. Climbing habits could be expected in a relative of the primates, but tree-dwelling animals are rarely found in such high numbers. Based on this and other evidence, some paleontologists have concluded that these animals were mainly living on the ground, like today's marmots and ground squirrels. However, more recent investigations have confirmed that the skeleton of Plesiadapis'' is that of an adept climber, which can be best compared to tree squirrels or to tree-dwelling marsupials such as possums. The short, robust limbs, the long, laterally compressed claws, and the long, bushy tail indicate that it was an arboreal quadruped.

References

External links
Mikko's Phylogeny Archive

Plesiadapiformes
Prehistoric placental genera
Paleocene mammals of North America
Eocene mammals of North America
Paleocene mammals of Europe
Eocene mammals of Europe
Ypresian extinctions
Fossil taxa described in 1877